Abattoir Blues / The Lyre of Orpheus is the thirteenth studio album by the Australian alternative rock band Nick Cave and the Bad Seeds, released on 20 September 2004 on Mute Records. It is a double album of seventeen songs.

History
The album was produced by Nick Launay at Studio Ferber in Paris in March–April 2004 and Nick Cave used The Bad Seeds line up of Mick Harvey, Thomas Wydler, Martyn Casey, Conway Savage, Jim Sclavunos, Warren Ellis, and James Johnston. It was the first album by the group for which Blixa Bargeld did not perform – English guitarist and organist Johnston, of the group Gallon Drunk, replaced Bargeld. Cave decided to split drumming duties for the two parts, with Sclavunos on Abattoir Blues and Wydler on The Lyre of Orpheus. According to Launay, the whole album was completed in twelve days.

The album's release was supported by the Abattoir Blues Tour, which travelled through Europe from 2 November to 5 December. In January 2007 a double live album and DVD was issued as The Abattoir Blues Tour. Abattoir Blues / The Lyre of Orpheuss last track, "O Children", was featured in the 2010 film Harry Potter and the Deathly Hallows – Part 1, and the song is referenced as an achievement in Lego Harry Potter: Years 5–7. In March 2005, to complement the success of the double album, Nick Cave and the Bad Seeds released B-Sides & Rarities, a three-disc, 56-track collection of B-sides, rarities, and tracks that had appeared on film soundtracks.

Critical reception

Abattoir Blues / The Lyre of Orpheus holds a score of 88 out of 100 from Metacritic, indicating "universal acclaim". Susan Carpenter of the Los Angeles Times described the album as "a bounty of gothic rock" and noted that "the more driving, menacing numbers have been separated from the slow and scurrilous in a double album that is not two-halves of a whole so much as two distinct records released simultaneously and in one package." Thom Jurek of AllMusic described Abattoir Blues as "a rock & roll record... a pathos-drenched, volume-cranked rocker, full of crunch, punishment – and taste" and The Lyre of Orpheus as "a much quieter, more elegant affair... more consciously restrained, its attention to craft and theatrical flair more prevalent.". Greg Simpson of Punknews.org said that Abattoir Blues "is very bluesy indeed, a rock and roll album with many angry songs and booming bass lines," while The Lyre of Orpheus "insists on being a separate album, due to its completely different more gentle feel." Dan Lawrence of Stereogum ranked the album at fifth in their list of best albums in Cave's discography, and described it musically as "riotous gospel rock".

In a rave review, Tiny Mix Tapes critic Grigsby wrote that while Abattoir Blues / The Lyre of Orpheus "may not be the best beginner's guide" to the band, for "anyone who is a fan of the duration of his career, this album rewards the listener with a bit of the best of everything he has to offer." Paste said: "Aside from the power of the music and lyrics, the set draws on Cave’s compelling persona: part priest, part sideshow barker--crooning one moment and eviscerating the next. While this has always been the core of his talent, on Abattoir/Lyre it is particularly rich and rewarding." In a more mixed assessment, Douglas Wolk, writing in Spin, was complimentary of Abattoir Blues but felt that The Lyre of Orpheus was "effectively Abattoir spillover: more mellow, less grand in conception, but—somehow—more pretentious in execution." In his Consumer Guide for The Village Voice, Robert Christgau designated three songs from the album ("The Lyre of Orpheus", "There She Goes, My Beautiful World", and "Hiding All Away") as "choice cuts", indicating good songs "on an album that isn't worth your time or money".

Pitchfork named Abattoir Blues / The Lyre of Orpheus the 180th best album of the 2000s. It was also included in the book 1001 Albums You Must Hear Before You Die.

Charts
Abattoir Blues / The Lyre of Orpheus reached No. 5 on the ARIA Albums Chart, its chart success in Europe includes No. 1 in Norway, No. 2 in Austria and Denmark, and top 10 in Belgium, Finland, Italy, Netherlands, Portugal, and Sweden. The album reached No. 1 on the Foreign Albums Chart in Greece where it also received a gold certification.

Track listing

Personnel
All personnel credits adapted from Abattoir Blues / The Lyre of Orpheuss liner notes.

Nick Cave and the Bad Seeds
Nick Cave – vocals, piano, production, mixing
Mick Harvey – guitar, production, mixing
Warren Ellis – violin, mandolin, bouzouki, flute, production, mixing
Martyn P. Casey – bass, production
Conway Savage – piano, production
James Johnston – organ, production
Jim Sclavunos – drums on Abattoir Blues, percussion, production
Thomas Wydler – drums on The Lyre of Orpheus, percussion, production

Guest musicians
Åse Bergstrøm – backing vocals
Donovan Lawrence – backing vocals
Geo Onayomake – backing vocals

Guest musicians (continued)
Lena Palmer – backing vocals
Stephanie Meade – backing vocals
Wendy Rose – backing vocals

Technical personnel
Nick Launay – producer, engineer, mixing
Lars Fox – digital audio editor
Ian Cooper – mastering

Design personnel
Tom Hingston – design, artwork
David Hughes – photography
Delphine Ciampi – photography

Charts

Certifications

References

Further reading
Masters, Mark. "Nick Cave: Interview.". Pitchfork. 29 September 2008.

Orloff, Brian. "Nick Cave Sings The Blues" Rolling Stone. 22 October 2004.

External links
 Official Website
 Anti (American distributor) biography and album description.
 

2004 albums
Nick Cave albums
Mute Records albums
Albums produced by Nick Launay
Orpheus